Bryony Frances Smith (born 12 December 1997) is an English cricketer who plays for Surrey, South East Stars and Trent Rockets. A right-handed batter who bowls off spin, she made her county debut for Surrey in 2014. She has played three T20Is and one ODI for England, making her debut in 2018.

Early life
Smith was born on 12 December 1997 in Sutton, Greater London. She has worked as a secondary school teacher.

Domestic career
Smith made her Surrey debut in 2014 in a County Championship match against Warwickshire, making 13 runs batting at 7. She made 60* in her second match, a victory against Yorkshire. Smith quickly became a regular in Surrey's side, with her best seasons coming in 2018 and 2019, in which she hit 256 runs at 42.66 and 347 runs at 57.83, respectively. In 2019, she was the third highest run-scorer in the whole tournament.

Smith played every season of the Women's Cricket Super League for the Surrey Stars, including their title winning season in 2018. In 2020, Smith played three games for the South East Stars in the Rachael Heyhoe Flint Trophy, and took 3/25 in a match against Sunrisers. In 2021, Smith took 14 wickets and scored 162 runs in the Charlotte Edwards Cup, making her the leading wicket-taker and sixth-highest run-scorer in the competition, as well as captaining the side through to winning the title. She also scored 252 runs and took 12 wickets in the 2021 Rachael Heyhoe Flint Trophy, placing her eighth on both the leading run-scorer and leading wicket-taker lists. She was also ever-present for Welsh Fire in The Hundred, scoring 137 runs and taking 4 wickets.

In April 2022, she was signed by the Trent Rockets for the 2022 season of The Hundred. She scored 118 runs for the side with a top score of 63, as well as being the side's leading wicket-taker, with 9 wickets at an average of 13.88. She was also South East Stars' leading run-scorer in the 2022 Rachael Heyhoe Flint Trophy, scoring 226 with a top score of 114.

International career
In March 2018, Smith was named in the England squad for the upcoming tri-series against India and Australia. She played three matches in the tournament, scoring 16 runs in total. 

In February 2019, she was awarded a rookie contract by the England and Wales Cricket Board (ECB) for 2019. In June 2019, she was added to England's squad for the third Women's One Day International (WODI) against the West Indies, and made her WODI debut in that match. She did not bat, but took her maiden international wicket, dismissing Natasha McLean.

On 18 June 2020, Smith was named in a squad of 24 players to begin training ahead of international women's fixtures starting in England following the COVID-19 pandemic, but did not play a match that summer. In December 2021, Smith was named in England's A squad for their tour to Australia, with the matches being played alongside the Women's Ashes.

In July 2022, she was named in England's squad for their T20I series against South Africa and for the cricket tournament at the 2022 Commonwealth Games in Birmingham, England.

References

External links
 
 

1997 births
People from Sutton, London
Living people
Surrey women cricketers
Surrey Stars cricketers
South East Stars cricketers
English women cricketers
England women One Day International cricketers
England women Twenty20 International cricketers
Welsh Fire cricketers
Cricketers at the 2022 Commonwealth Games
Commonwealth Games competitors for England
Trent Rockets cricketers